Claremore Lake is a reservoir in Rogers County, Oklahoma. Constructed in 1929-1930  by damming Dog Creek for the purpose of providing water to the city of Claremore, Oklahoma  and houses recreational amenities such as boat ramps, fishing docks, and picnic areas. In 2011, the lake added a 9-hole disc golf course. 

The park has two separate playgrounds and has picnic tables and grills available for public use. There are also two covered shelters with electrical outlets. Shelters can be rented through the Claremore Parks and Recreation Department. Camping is not allowed, and animals must be restrained at all times. Alcohol is prohibited.

References

External links
"Claremore Lake" from the Oklahoma Department of Tourism

Protected areas of Rogers County, Oklahoma
Reservoirs in Oklahoma
Bodies of water of Rogers County, Oklahoma